Walter A. Guerra (born June 7, 1962, in Panama City, Panama) is a retired American Thoroughbred horse racing jockey who rode successfully in both Steeplechase and flat racing, in the latter winning two Breeders' Cup World Championship races.

Guerra began riding in the United States in 1979 at Calder Race Course where his success over the years would result in his 1998 induction into the Calder Race Course Hall of Fame. He was 22 years old when he won the 1984 Breeders' Cup Juvenile Fillies with Outstandingly. The following year he rode Cozzene to a win in the Breeders' Cup Mile.

In 1996, Walter Guerra retired from riding but made a brief comeback in 1999 before retiring permanently.

References

1962 births
Living people
American jockeys
Panamanian jockeys
Panamanian emigrants to the United States
Sportspeople from Panama City